Keep Punching may refer to:

 A propaganda poster used by the United States of America during World War II; see Propaganda during World War II
 Keep Punching (1939 film), an American film
 Keep Punching (2013 film), a documentary film produced by Killer Goose Films